Joan King (born 1940 or 1941) is a former Canadian school trustee and city councillor. After holding a five-year position on the North York Board of Education from 1980 to 1985, King was a city councillor for North York from 1985 to 1997. Following the amalgamation of Toronto in 1997, she was a Toronto City Councillor from 1997 to 2000. King was awarded the Queen’s Golden Jubilee Medal in 2013.

Biography
King was born in the early 1940s. During her career, King started with the North York Board of Education in 1980. King left her education career in 1985 and was elected as the North York city councilor for Ward 13 at the 1985 Toronto municipal election. As city councilor, King was a major contributor to the planned landfill at Adams Mine in 1991, which was later abandoned. King kept her position in Metropolitan Toronto until 1997 when she was elected to the Toronto City Council. Before the 2000 Toronto municipal election, King announced that she would not be running for city council again.

In 2010, King was named a member of a proposed municipal reformation for Toronto mayoral candidate George Smitherman. Outside of her role as city councillor, King was elected as Vice President of the Association of Municipalities of Ontario in 1996 and a member of the AMO's board of directors from 1997 until 2001. King was also a member of the Waste Diversion Organization and the Greater Toronto Services Board.

Awards and honours
In 2001, King was named onto an honour roll by the AMO. In 2013, she was honoured with the Queen’s Golden Jubilee Medal.

References

Living people
Toronto city councillors
Year of birth uncertain
Place of birth missing (living people)
Year of birth missing (living people)